The Seven Stupidest Things to Escape From is a television comedy programme in which Jonathan Goodwin, the extreme escapologist tries to come up with the stupidest things to escape from. These include 50,000 bees and a dog.

References

https://www.imdb.com/title/tt0795465/

External links

Channel 4 original programming
2005 British television series debuts
2005 British television series endings
Escapology
British television magic shows